Osny Augusto Werner commonly known as Osny, (11 October 1898 - 14 May 1971) was a Brazilian football player. He was a member of the Brazilian squad at the 1916 and 1917 Copa America playing alongside Arthur Friedenreich, Amílcar Barbuy, and Casemiro. Osny, a Botafogo player, was one of the most cult and iconic figures in the early days of the Brazilian football. After retiring from football he started a new career as a referee.

The blanket centaur
Osny was known for his quirky style as he wore eyeglasses, a cap and had a towel wrapped around his neck during the games. He inevitably caught the attention of the crowd in Botafogo's away games. Famous Brazilian writer Nelson Rodrigues once described him as the blanket centaur, a phrase that ever since became Osny's nickname.

See also
 Botafogo RJ

References

External links
 Profile on Zerozero
 Profile on NFT
 Profile on Sport.de

1898 births
1971 deaths
Footballers from Rio de Janeiro (city)
Brazilian footballers
Brazil international footballers
Botafogo de Futebol e Regatas players
Association football defenders
Brazilian football referees